Westmarsh is a village in the Ash civil parish of East Kent, England.

Westmarsh is within a designated area of outstanding natural beauty and orchard filled countryside.

The community centres on the village hall where local events are held. Historic buildings include  Wingham Barton Manor, a Tudor country house, and Barton Barn, one of the oldest surviving isle barns in the country. The previous Rose Inn public house became the Way Out Inn, then The Rose Garden Tea Rooms which has since closed to the public. The nearest railway station is at Sandwich

References

External links

Villages in Kent
Dover District